William Sneyd (12 August 1895 – 1985) was an English footballer who played for Rochdale when they joined the English Football League in 1921.

References

Rochdale A.F.C. players
English footballers
1895 births
1985 deaths
Footballers from Oldham
Association football goalkeepers